Ctenodiscidae is a family of echinoderms belonging to the order Paxillosida.

Genera:
 Ctenodiscus Müller & Troschel, 1842
 Paleoctenodiscus Blake, 1988

References

Paxillosida
Echinoderm families